The 2005–06 season was the 77th season in the existence of U.S. Catanzaro and the club's second consecutive season in the second division of Italian football. In addition to the domestic league, Catanzaro participated in this season's edition of the Coppa Italia.

Squad 

 Source: calcio-seriea.net

Transfers

Pre-season and friendlies

Competitions

Overall record

Serie B

League table

Results summary

Results by round

Matches

Coppa Italia

References

U.S. Catanzaro 1929 seasons
Catanzaro